"Jump n' Shout" is a song recorded by English electronic music duo Basement Jaxx. It was released on 25 October 1999 by XL Recordings as the third single from their debut album, Remedy.

Composition

"Jump n' Shout" features ragga vocals by MC Slarta John.

Release
"Jump n' Shout" was released on 25 October 1999 by record label XL. It reached number 12 in the UK Singles Chart.

Music video
A music video was released to promote the single.

Track listings 
UK CD
 "Jump n' Shout" (Edit) – 3:35
 "La Photo" – 3:57
 "I Beg U" – 8:33

UK 12"
 "Jump n' Shout" – 5:21
 "I Beg U" – 8:33
 "Jump n' Shout" (Boo Slinga Dub) – 8:54

References 

1999 singles
XL Recordings singles
1999 songs
Basement Jaxx songs
Songs written by Simon Ratcliffe (musician)
Songs written by Felix Buxton